P2P Universal Computing Consortium (PUCC) is promoting research and development of an open P2P/Overlay network service platform that connects multi-types of devices users use, and conducts the standardization efforts. PUCC is a cross-industry consortium for open P2P/Overlay network standards. PUCC operations are supported by a combination of membership dues and public grants.

Objectives
 
 Realize a seamless peer-to-peer communication platform that enables the creations of high level ubiquitous service between multi type networks and devices
 Create neutral protocols through cross-industry cooperation by sharing comm-interoperable on goals and visions
 Conduct research and development to create compelling technologies that support our everyday lives.

Working Groups
Architecture & Protocols (ap-wg)
Printing (prt-wg)
Streaming (st-wg)
Security (sec-wg)
Home Appliance Control (ha-wg)
Sensor Device Control WG (sdc-wg)
Healthcare Device WG (hc-wg) To be appeared soon
Device IOP Task Force (dev-tf)

History

In 2004, PUCC (P2P Universal Computing Consortium)  was founded in Tokyo .  The founding members were NTT DoCoMO,  Ericsson, Kyoto University, and Keio University.
April 2005: The Working Groups were started.  started standardization work on an open overlay network in the area of several applications, as well as core communication protocols and metadata.
July 2006: First government supported R&D was started.  R&D work on harmonization of mobile network, home network, imaging devices was conducted using government funds.
March 2007: First PUCC specifications were published.
June 2007:  PUCC joined the Healthy Living project, as a part of the Information Grand Voyage Project, supported by METI (Ministry of Economy, Trade and Industry).
November 2008: PUCC continuously supports the Information Grad Voyage Project.  PUCC open overlay network is used as a platform to gather information and NON-IP networks and devices such as sensor networks, USB, Bluetooth.

PUCC chairs

 Nobuo Saito (2004)

References

External links
The official PUCC site

Computer network organizations
Standards organizations in Japan